Hans Soots (10 July 1886 Polli Parish (now Mulgi Parish), Kreis Pernau – 4 June 1937 Pöögle Parish, Viljandi County) was an Estonian politician. He was a member of II Riigikogu, representing the Farmers' Assemblies. On 8 October 1923, he resigned his position and he was replaced by Jaan Eigo.

References

1886 births
1937 deaths
People from Mulgi Parish
People from Kreis Pernau
Farmers' Assemblies politicians
Members of the Riigikogu, 1923–1926